XLVII Panzer Corps (also: 47th Panzer Corps or XXXXVII. Panzerkorps or XXXXVII Panzer Corps) was a panzer corps of the German Army in World War II that was formerly designated as XLVII Corps. Various formations of the corps fought in the French campaign of 1940, in the invasion of Soviet Union from 1941 to 1944, and on the Western Front from June 1944 until April 1945.

Initial Formation
The first formation of the XLVII Corps was on 20 June 1940, during the Campaign in France. This formation was shortly thereafter disbanded on 1 July 1940. The corps was formed again as a motorized corps on 25 November 1940 in Military Region XI. The new corps was initially stationed in Germany as part of Army Group C.

Eastern Front
In May 1941, the corps was subordinated to Panzer Group 2 (later 2nd Panzer Army) and took part in the invasion of the Soviet Union, Operation Barbarossa, in 1941. On 21 June 1942, the corps was retitled XLVII Panzer Corps. The corps remained on the Russian front until March 1944, when it was stationed in France.

Western Front
In 1944, the corps was transferred to the Western Front. The corps took part in the Mortain offensive, and attacked into the central Ardennes during the Battle of the Bulge. The corps was retitled Army Group Lüttwitz in January 1945. On 16 April, the corps surrendered with other German troops in the Ruhr Pocket to the U.S. Army.

Orders of Battle

10 December 1940
 14th Infantry Division
 19th Panzer Division
 20th Panzer Division
 4th Panzer Division
 20th Infantry Division (Motorized)

22 June 1941
 29th Infantry Division (Motorized)
 17th Panzer Division
 18th Panzer Division
 167th Infantry Division

16 September 1944
 21st Panzer Division
 111th Panzer Brigade
 112th Panzer Brigade
 113th Panzer Brigade

15 December 1944
 Corps Troops:
 182nd Flak Sturm Regiment 
 1124th Heavy Artillery Battery
 1119th Heavy Mortar Battery
 600th Engineer Battalion
 15th (mot) Volks Werfer Brigade 
 55th Nebelwerfer Regiment
 85th Nebelwerfer Regiment
 766th (mot) Volksartilleriekorps
 2nd Panzer Division
 Panzer Lehr Division
 26th Volksgrenadier Division

Notes

Footnotes

References
Books

 .
  
 
 

Websites

 
 

Panzer corps of Germany in World War II
Military units and formations established in 1940
Military units and formations disestablished in 1940
Military units and formations disestablished in 1945